Kołobrzeg railway station is a railway station in Kołobrzeg, Poland. As of 2022, it is served by Polregio (local and InterRegio services) and PKP Intercity (EIP, InterCity, and TLK services).

Train services

The station is served by the following services:

Express Intercity Premium services (EIP) Kołobrzeg - Gdynia - Warsaw - Kraków
 Intercity services (IC) Łódź Fabryczna - Warszawa - Gdańsk - Kołobrzeg
 Intercity services (IC) Kołobrzeg - Piła - Bydgoszcz - Warszawa - Lublin - Hrubieszów 
Intercity services (IC) Kołobrzeg - Piła - Poznań - Wrocław - Opole - Kraków
Intercity services (TLK) Kołobrzeg - Gdynia- Warszawa Wschodnia - Kraków
Regional services (R) Słupsk — Koszalin — Kołobrzeg
Regional services (R) Kołobrzeg — Koszalin
Regional services (R) Kołobrzeg — Koszalin — Białogard — Szczecinek — Piła Główna — Poznań Główny
Regional services (R) Koszalin — Kołobrzeg — Goleniów — Szczecin Główny

References 

Station article at  koleo.pl

Railway stations in West Pomeranian Voivodeship
Railway stations served by Przewozy Regionalne InterRegio
Railway station
Railway stations in Poland opened in 1859